André Maes (born 27 December 1917, date of death unknown) was a Belgian sailor. He competed in the Flying Dutchman event at the 1960 Summer Olympics.

References

External links
 

1917 births
Year of death missing
Belgian male sailors (sport)
Olympic sailors of Belgium
Sailors at the 1960 Summer Olympics – Flying Dutchman
Sportspeople from Ghent